Yonezawa is a city in Yamagata Prefecture, Japan.

Yonezawa may also refer to:

Yonezawa (surname)
Yonezawa Toys, a Japanese toy company
Yonezawa Domain, a former domain in Dewa Province, Japan

See also
Yonezawa beef